The Zhongguancun Administrative Committee is a committee which oversees the affairs of Zhongguancun, Beijing.

References

External links
Official site